Willie Hargreaves (birth registered second ¼ 1931 – 4 July 2013), also known by the nickname of "Little Rock", was an English professional rugby league footballer who played in the 1950s and 1960s.

Background
Willie Hargreaves' birth was registered in Wakefield district, West Riding of Yorkshire, England, he died aged 82 in York, North Yorkshire, England, and his funeral took place at York Crematorium at 10.20am on Friday 19 July 2013.

Playing career

County Cup Final appearances
Willie Hargreaves played  in York's 8-15 defeat by Huddersfield in the 1957 Yorkshire County Cup Final during the 1957–58 season at Headingley Rugby Stadium, Leeds on Saturday 19 October 1957.

Club career
Willie Hargreaves made his début for York on Monday 3 November 1952, and he played his last match for York on Sunday 20 November 1966.

Testimonial match
Willie Hargreaves' Testimonial match for York took place in 1962.

Honoured at York Rugby League
The first seven players to be inducted into the York Rugby League Hall of Fame during March 2013 were; Geoffrey Pryce, Gary Smith (rugby league, York born), Vic Yorke, Norman Fender, Willie Hargreaves, Basil Watts and Edgar Dawson.

Genealogical information
Willie Hargreaves' marriage to Doretta Shirley (née Lister) (birth registered third ¼  in Knaresborough district) was registered during third ¼ 1954 in York district. They had children; Stephanie E. Hargreaves (birth registered first ¼  in York district), Julie A. Hargreaves (birth registered third ¼  in York district), and Graham P. Hargreaves (birth registered first ¼  in York district).

References

External links
Search for "Hargreaves" at rugbyleagueproject.org

1931 births
2013 deaths
English rugby league players
Place of death missing
Rugby league players from Wakefield
Rugby league fullbacks
York Wasps players